The 1992–93 Duke Blue Devils men's basketball team represented Duke University in the 1992–93 NCAA Division I men's basketball season. Their head coach was Mike Krzyzewski in his 13th season with the Blue Devils. The team played their home games at Cameron Indoor Stadium as members of the Atlantic Coast Conference. The team finished the season 24–8, 10–6 in ACC play to finish a tie for third place. They lost to Georgia Tech in the quarterfinals of the ACC tournament. They received an at large bid to the NCAA tournament as the No. 3 seed in the Midwest Region. There they defeated Southern Illinois in the first round before being upset by California in the second round.

The Blue Devils entered the season looking to win their third consecutive national championship and entered the season as the No. 3 team in preseason polling. They reached No. 1 in the polls on December 7, 1992, and stayed there for five consecutive weeks as the Blue Devils won their first 10 games. A loss to Georgia Tech on January 10, 1993, ended their streak and knocked them from No. 1.

The season was the last for guard Duke great Bobby Hurley.

Schedule

|-
!colspan=9 style=|Regular Season

|-
!colspan=9 style=|NCAA tournament

|-
!colspan=9 style=|NCAA tournament

References 

Duke Blue Devils men's basketball seasons
Duke
Duke
1992 in sports in North Carolina
1993 in sports in North Carolina